Storage Hunters is a reality television series presented by Sean Kelly (as the auctioneer). It originally ran in the United States from 2011 to 2014 on TruTV and has been shown in the UK on the digital channel Dave. A domestic UK version, also featuring Kelly, started broadcasting in 2014 and continued into 2016 with a fifth series that aired in April 2016. There was also a UK celebrity special which aired for Christmas 2015, with all the money each celebrity made going to their chosen charity.

In October 2016, Dave announced that a celebrity series would take place, following the huge hit of the one-off special earlier in the year, with five 60-minute episodes. The format is the same, all the money they made went to their chosen charity.

The series has also been shown on New Zealand's TV3.

Background
Sean Kelly grew up in Germany. After leaving school, he worked as a store detective before joining the Army, becoming a German interpreter, and then being stationed in Iraq. He then worked as an auctioneer, and compering comedy clubs at night. After a fight broke out at an auction, he came up with the idea for the show, describing it as "Antiques Roadshow meets WWF!"

Format

For the US series,  bidders Brandon and Lori Bernier. It continued with the Taylor Brothers, Jesse McClure, Tarrell "T-Money" Wright, Ron "Papa Bear" Kirkpatrick, Kashuna, Wade, FJ, Gary "Goal Machine" Madine, Scott and Chrissy Tassone, the Alvardo Brothers, "Desert Dan," Mone Smith, Will and Nick Eastwood, Soccer Mom and the lock cutters/security guards, Will C. (Season 1), Cameron "Green Mile" Rowe (Season 2-Season 3). The series was cancelled on TruTV after Season 3 ended.

In the UK and Ireland the show has been broadcast and repeated on the digital channel Dave. In 2014, Dave commissioned a spin-off series called Storage Hunters UK, featuring Kelly reprising his role as auctioneer with a series of UK bidders hunting for valuables across the UK. Dave renewed the UK version for two more series in 2015, with the second series beginning on 2 June and featuring US regulars Jesse and T-Money. Series 3 of the show premiered on 15 September 2015.

A fifth series was commissioned to air from April 2016, with Kelly returning alongside regular bidders from series 4.

A one-off UK celebrity special aired at Christmas 2015, with any money made being donated to the celebrity individual charities. This was followed by a series of 5 more celebrity episodes that aired at the end of 2016.

Series overview

Reception
The show has been well received in Britain, with the first episode of Storage Hunters UK being watched by over 1.1 million viewers, beating ratings for several prime time television shows broadcast that week.

The Guardian Rhik Samadder described Kelly's auctioneering style "like someone has attached electrodes to a woodpecker". Tom Eames writing in Digital Spy described it as "one of the least authentic and most fake shows you will ever see, and comes under the umbrella of 'trashy reality' programmes that the US are very good at", but adding that "somehow, it is strangely addictive and enjoyable, and has clearly become a big guilty pleasure of many UK viewers."

Presenter Sean Kelly has attributed the success of the show to the participants' lack of social skills and compared it to "watching a carnival". In an interview for Digital Spy he speculated that the strong popularity of the show in the UK may lead to a revival of the US series.

Buyers

Main Buyers US

Main Buyers UK

Main Celebrity Buyers UK

Minor Buyers US

Minor Buyers UK

See also
 Auction Hunters, a similar show on Spike TV
 Storage Wars, a similar show on A&E TV
 Container Wars, a similar series on TruTV

References 

The Daily Mirror Brandon Bernier tells all "I was never happy in this chaotic relationship, I was miserable"

External links 
 
 

2010s American reality television series
2011 American television series debuts
2013 American television series endings
Auction television series
English-language television shows
TruTV original programming